Inger Marie Bakken (born 3 June 1951) is a Norwegian politician for the Socialist Left Party.

She served as a deputy representative to the Norwegian Parliament from Sør-Trøndelag during the term 1981–1985.

She is a former member of the board of the Norwegian State Educational Loan Fund.

References

1951 births
Living people
Socialist Left Party (Norway) politicians
Deputy members of the Storting
Sør-Trøndelag politicians
Place of birth missing (living people)
20th-century Norwegian women politicians